Type 528 reconnaissance boat is a type of reconnaissance boat developed by China for the People's Liberation Army Navy (PLAN).

Built by Wuzhou shipyard,
the predecessor of China Guijiang Shipbuilding Co., Ltd. (中船桂江造船有限公司) in the 1960s, Type 528 is also deployed as patrol boat, though its primary mission was to deliver reconnaissance and special forces to their intended destinations.

References

Gunboat classes
Gunboats of the People's Liberation Army Navy